Olivier Besengez (born 19 September 1971) is a retired Belgian football defender.

References

1971 births
Living people
Belgian footballers
R.E. Mouscron players
Association football defenders
Belgian Pro League players
People from Tournai